Sigma Software  is a Swedish-Ukrainian software company of Ukrainian origin. It provides software development and IT consulting services to 170+ customers internationally in the areas of e-commerce, document management, telecommunications, aviation and space industries, banking, finance and real estate, digital advertising, entertainment and game development.

Headquartered in Ukraine, Sigma Software has regional offices in several other countries: Poland, the USA, Sweden, Austria, the UK, Australia, Singapore, and Canada. The company is on the list of TOP-20 largest IT companies in Ukraine.  it has about 1,500 employees.

History 
The company was founded in 2002 in Kharkiv, Ukraine and named Eclipse Software Programming (Eclipse SP). In 2007 it joined Sigma AB, a Scandinavian ІТ consulting company. In 2011 the company changed its name to Sigma Ukraine, and in 2014 – to Sigma Software.

Social impact 
The company is a member of the European Business Association on IT-related matters and takes part in lobbying activities aimed at creating favorable conditions for developing the IT industry in Ukraine.

The company is also a member of the TEMPUS program designed to strengthen cooperation among educational establishments, scientific institutes, and businesses in Ukraine.

In 2016 the company established Sigma Software University – an educational platform for developing the IT community and further training established experts. The platform collaborates with 14 universities, colleges, and schools in five cities – Kharkiv, Kyiv, Lviv, Odesa and Dnipro. This collaboration includes assistance from company experts in the development of new educational IT courses, their teaching of certain tech and management courses, providing internship opportunities, holding events for the students and the IT community, equipping educational laboratories.

Since 2017 Sigma Software has been organizing the  Open Tech Week, a series of charity meetups aimed at experience exchange and networking. The events take place four times a year in Ukrainian cities where the company’s offices are located. All money raised at these events is sent to local charity funds.

The company is a sponsor of a scholarship in the Ukrainian Catholic University

The company organizes company teams for marathons and supports the Sigma Software Unicorns cycling team.

In 2011–2019 the company organized NETwork conferences. In 2018-2019, Sigma Software invested in several of its own products, including: cybersecurity product development company Clean.io, which became Baltimore's Startup of the Year, and raised $5 million in investment.

References

External links 
Sigma Software – official website
Sigma Software University

Software companies of Ukraine
Companies based in Kharkiv